BSSE may refer to:

 Bratislava Stock Exchange
 Basis set superposition error
 Bachelor of Science in Software Engineering, more commonly called a Bachelor of Software Engineering
 Bally Sports Southeast, American regional sports network owned and operated by Bally Sports